Arthur Charlesworth (4 February 1898 – 4 January 1966) was an English footballer.

Charlesworth played for Hull City, Worksop Town, Doncaster Rovers and York City.
He was the son of Albert Percy Charlesworth, who played first class cricket for Yorkshire County Cricket Club.

References

1898 births
Footballers from Kingston upon Hull
1966 deaths
English footballers
Association football forwards
Hull City A.F.C. players
Worksop Town F.C. players
Doncaster Rovers F.C. players
York City F.C. players
English Football League players
Midland Football League players
Sportspeople from Morley, West Yorkshire